Thābit ibn Safiya famously known as Abū Hamzah al-Thumālī Thābit ibn Dīnār was a close companion of Imam Ali Zayn al-Abidin.

Life
Abu Hamza al-Thumali was pious and righteous companion of Ali Zayn al-Abidin. He was also a companion of Muhammad al-Baqir and Ja'far al-Sadiq. Al-Najashi said: “He was the best of our companions and the most reliable of them in narration and tradition.” It was reported on the authority of Ali al-Ridha who said: “Abu Hamza at his time is like Salman at his time.” His supplication was accepted. His sons died martyrs with the great revolutionist, Zayd ibn Ali.
 
He died in the year 150 A.H.

Works
 Kitab fi Tafsir al-Quran al-Karim (An exegesis of the Quran). 
 Kitab al-Nawadir (A Book on the rare things). 
 Kitab al-Zuhd (A Book on Asceticism).

Supplication of Abu Hamza al-Thumali

Abu Hamza al-Thumali has related that during the month of Ramadhan, Ali Zayn al-Abidin used to spend a greater part of the night in prayers and when it used to be the time of beginning of the fast he recited a supplication which later known as Du'a Abi Hamzah al-Thumali (The supplication of Abi Hamzah al-Thumali). This supplication has been recorded in the book Misbah al-Mutahijjid of Shaykh Tusi.

See also
 List of Shi'a Muslim scholars of Islam
 Sayyid Murtadhā
 Sayyid Radhī
 Shaykh al-Mufīd
 Shaykh al-Tūsī
 Shaykh al-Sadūq
 Muhammad al-Kulaynī
 Allāmah Majlisī
 Shaykh al-Hur al-Āmilī
 Zakaria ibn Idris Ash'ari Qomi
 Ahmad ibn Ishaq Ash'ari Qomi
 List of Shia books

References

Iraqi Shia Muslims
Year of birth unknown
Place of birth unknown
760s deaths
Shia hadith scholars